Daniil Sergeyevich Yarusov (born 25 January 2001) is a Russian football player.

Club career
He made his debut in the Russian Football National League for FC Chayka Peschanokopskoye on 29 November 2020 in a game against FC Volgar Astrakhan.

References

External links
 Profile by Russian Football National League
 

2001 births
People from Primorsky Krai
Sportspeople from Primorsky Krai
Living people
Russian footballers
Association football goalkeepers
FC Spartak-2 Moscow players
FC Chayka Peschanokopskoye players
Noravank SC players
Russian First League players
Russian Second League players
Armenian Premier League players
Russian expatriate footballers
Expatriate footballers in Armenia
Russian expatriate sportspeople in Armenia